Physiologia Plantarum is a peer-reviewed scientific journal published by Wiley-Blackwell on behalf of the Scandinavian Plant Physiology Society. The journal publishes papers on all aspects of all organizational levels of experimental plant biology ranging from biophysics, biochemistry, molecular and cell biology to ecophysiology.

According to the Journal Citation Reports, the journal has a 2021 impact factor of 5.081, ranking it 33rd out of 235 journals in the category "Plant Sciences".

References

External links 
 
 https://physiologiaplantarum.org/

Wiley-Blackwell academic journals
English-language journals
Physiology journals
Botany journals
Monthly journals
Publications established in 1948